Delhi Times is a supplement magazine circulated with the Times of India in New Delhi, Delhi. The daily supplement focuses on city specific issues, in a very lucid manner, which generally appeal to urban youth. This supplement covers page 3 parties, entertainment news and includes regular features like television guide, movies, regular crosswords. A large part of the supplement is dedicated to celebrity gossip from Bollywood and Hollywood. It also serves as a lifestyle magazine for readers in Delhi.

External links 
 Delhi Times - online supplement

The Times of India
Publications of The Times Group
Publications with year of establishment missing
Mass media in Delhi